Frank Hall may refer to:
Frank Hall (broadcaster) (1921–1995), Irish television personality
Frank Hall (drummer) (born 1949), English drummer
Frank Hall (sailor) (born 1944), Canadian athlete
Frank Hall (sport shooter) (1865–1939), American sport shooter
Frank Hall (trade unionist) (1860–1927), English trade unionist
Franklin P. Hall (1938–2015), known as Frank, minority leader of the Virginia House of Delegates
Frank Haven Hall (1841–1911), American educator
Frank J. Hall (1844–1925), American politician and Lieutenant Governor of Indiana
Frank P. Hall (1870–1926), American judge and Justice of the Tennessee Supreme Court
Frank S. Hall (Tennessee politician) (1890–1958), American politician from Tennessee
Frank S. Hall (New York politician), member of the New York State Assembly
Frank Hall Standish (1799–1840), English book and art collector

See also
Frank A. Hall House, Westfield, Chautauqua County, New York
Francis Hall (disambiguation)
Franklin Hall (disambiguation)